Romantic is a 2021 Indian Telugu-language romantic film directed by Anil Paduri. It is written by Puri Jagannadh who co-produced the film with Charmme Kaur under Puri Connects. The film stars Akash Puri, debutante Ketika Sharma and Ramya Krishna. The film was released theatrically on 29 October 2021.

Plot 
Vasco da Gama son of a cop is a street smart ruffian who chooses crime to earn a fortune and fulfill his grandma Mary’s dream after watching his parents death. He and his childhood friend Annie join Goa’s most notorious drug mafia lord Rodrigues’ gang. Within no time, Vasco becomes a kingpin in the Goa underworld. Vasco falls for the charms and ‘back’ beauty of a young musician named Monica later it soon turns out into a passionate affair. After a failed drug deal, Vasco kills Rodrigues and proclaims himself as the new mafia king of Goa. In the process, he kills an SI and that’s when a dutiful and ruthless ACP Ramya Gowarikar is transferred from Mumbai to Goa to nab Vasco. At the same time Samsun a rival of Rodrigues wants his drugs containers worths crores steels by Vasco and his gang tries to nab him off. After a Cat and Mouse game ensues between the 3 groups finally Vasco achieves his grand mother dream for building a new homes for his community, later he kills Samsun but in the final battle with Ramya he was finally shot dead by her and confess that he Respects her a lot because she was like his father who is very sincere and dies in the arms of Mary. After watching his death Monica shot her self to death just like that. Before dying they hug each other and do a spinning move and shoot at police but they are finally shot by Ramya. Finally film ends that Ramya realises  that the Vasco and Monica did not realised they were in love and thinks they are having an affair and dies for it and sadly declares the drug mafia ends in Goa.

Cast 
 Akash Puri as Vasco De Gama
 Ketika Sharma as Monica (Voice dubbed by Chinmayi Sripada)
 Ramya Krishna as Ramya Gowarikar
 Rama Prabha as Mary
 Makarand Deshpande as Samsun
 Uttej as John
 Sunaina as Catherine
 Deviyani Sharma as Annie
Bharath Reddy as Sub-Inspector Alexander, Vasco's father
 Puri Jagannadh (cameo appearance in the song "Peene Ke Baad")
 Ram Pothineni (cameo appearance in the song "Peene Ke Baad")

Music

Release 
The film was initially scheduled for a theatrical release on 29 May 2020 but it was postponed due to the COVID-19 pandemic. On 1 March 2021, new release date was announced as 18 June 2021. Later, it was postponed to 4 November 2021. Later, it was rescheduled to 29 October 2021.

Reception 
The Times of India critic Neeshitha Nyayapati called it " Puri's gangster version of Romeo & Juliet," rating the film 3 stars of 5. In her review for The Hindu, Y. Sunita Chowdhary felt Romantic was "voyeuristic drama at best." Murali Krishna CH of The New Indian Express criticized the writing, calling it an "assault on our senses."

References

External links 
 
2020s Telugu-language films
Indian romantic action films
2021 romantic drama films
2021 films